Northview High School is one of three comprehensive high schools within the Covina-Valley Unified School District, California, United States. Northview High School serves the cities of Covina and Irwindale.

Curriculum
Northview High offers numerous Honors and Advanced Placement classes.
Advanced Placement courses at Northview High include:
Biology
Calculus AB
Calculus BC
English Language & Composition
English Literature & Composition
Environmental Science
European History
Macroeconomics
Spanish Language
Spanish Literature
Statistics
Studio Art
U.S. Government & Politics

Honors courses at Northview High include:

Algebra II
Biology
Chemistry
Comp/Lit I, II
Trigonometry/Pre-Calculus
United States History
World History/Culture

Notable alumni/faculty

 Lacey Baker - professional skateboarder 
 Rick Baker - Oscar-winning Hollywood make-up artist, class of 1968
 Mark Clear (born 1956) - major league baseball two-time All Star relief pitcher
 Tatiana Suarez - professional Mixed Martial Artist, current UFC Strawweight
 Chris Woodward - Former major league baseball player, and manager of the Texas Rangers from 2019-2022.
 Thomas Granger, Former, UFL United Football League Safety Las Vegas Locomotives Former American Sports University Head Football Coach 2010-2013.
 Tim Corcoran, former Major League Baseball player

References

High schools in Los Angeles County, California
Covina, California
Public high schools in California
Valle Vista League
1959 establishments in California
Educational institutions established in 1959